The Western Pacific Depot, also known as 3rd Street station, was a train station in Oakland, California. It opened in 1910 as the western terminus of the Western Pacific Railroad, located on 3rd Street with street running tracks at the corner of Washington Street. It was the last stop of the original California Zephyr, and earlier Exposition Flyer. The station closed in 1970 with the end of the service. The rails leading into the station were also removed with neighboring area redeveloped. The building was subsequently sold and converted to a restaurant and multiple other tenants since. In 1974, it was designated the first Oakland Designated Landmark.

References

Further reading
 
 

Former Western Pacific Railroad stations
Railway stations in the United States opened in 1910
Railway stations closed in 1970
Railway stations in Oakland, California
History of Oakland, California
Repurposed railway stations in the United States
Former railway stations in California